Angela Sommer-Bodenburg (born December 18, 1948) is the author of a number of fantasy books for children. Her most famous contribution to the field of children's fantasy is The Little Vampire series, which has sold over 10 million copies and has been translated into over 30 languages. Sommer-Bodenburg states that her "vampire is not a bloodthirsty monster, however, but an affectionate little vampire with fears and foibles who will perhaps help free children of their own fears."  The novel, written in 1979, spawned a series of books, and the plot has been adapted to theatre, radio, cinema, and television.  A Canadian-German TV series was released in 1986 and a film version, directed by Uli Edel was released in 2000. Later a CG-animated film The Little Vampire 3D, directed by Richard Claus and Karsten Kiilerich, was released in 2017.

Life and career
Sommer-Bodenburg was born in Reinbek, Germany. She studied education, philosophy, and sociology at the University of Hamburg.  She was assistant master at intermediate and secondary school in Hamburg, Germany from 1972 to 1984 and wrote the first chapter of The Little Vampire as an experiment to see what types of literature could hold the interest of her students. In 1984, she retired from teaching and dedicated herself to painting and writing. She has written more than forty books both for children and adults, from poetry to novels. She calls the success of the Little Vampire series a "mixed blessing" to her career as an author, stating on her website: "I was pigeon-holed as the author of children's books and, within this pigeon-hole, I was further classified as the author of vampire books."

She moved to Rancho Santa Fe, California, in 1992 after visiting the production company, Propaganda Films, in Hollywood that wished to make the film version of The Little Vampire. In 2004, she moved to Silver City, New Mexico.

Bibliography

English

The Little Vampire series
The first five books of Sommer-Bodenburg's debut series (original German title: Der kleine Vampir), when released in the United States, all excluded the word "Little" from the title. The first book was also released as My Friend the Vampire.  Only volumes 1-5 were released in the United States.  All other English translations were released in the United Kingdom.

Andersen Press
The Little Vampire, vol. #1 
The Little Vampire Moves In, vol. #2
The Little Vampire Takes a Trip, vol. #3
The Little Vampire On the Farm, vol. #4
The Little Vampire In Love, vol. #5

Simon & Schuster Young Books
The Little Vampire In Danger, vol. #6
The Little Vampire In the Vale Of Doom, vol. #7
The Little Vampire In Despair, vol. #8
The Little Vampire and the Mystery Patient, vol. #9
The Little Vampire In the Lion's Den, vol. #10
The Little Vampire Learns To Be Brave, vol. #11
The Little Vampire Gets a Surprise, vol. #12
The Little Vampire and the Wicked Plot, vol. #13
The Little Vampire and the School Trip, vol. #14
The Little Vampire and the Christmas Surprise, vol. #15

MacDonald Young Books
The Little Vampire Meets Count Dracula, vol. # 16

Scholastic
The Little Vampire Activity Book

Untranslated to English
These have yet to be released with an English translation.
The Little Vampire and the Dance Hour, vol #17
The Little Vampire Has a Birthday, vol #18
The Little Vampire and the Night of the Shivers, vol. #19
The Little Vampire and the Last Conversion, vol #20
The Little Vampire and the Question of Questions, vol #21

Others
But Still, I Love Her Just The Same:Poems  (Poetry)
If You Want To Scare Yourself (Short stories)
Coco's Birthday Surprise (children's book)

German
Der kleine Vampir, 1979
Sarah bei den Wölfen, Gedichte, 1979
Der kleine Vampir zieht um, 1980
Das Biest, das im Regen kam, 1981
Ich lieb dich trotzdem immer, Gedichte, 1982
Der kleine Vampir verreist, 1982
Der kleine Vampir auf dem Bauernhof, 1983
Wenn du dich gruseln willst, 1984
Der kleine Vampir und die große Liebe, 1985
Der kleine Vampir in Gefahr, 1985
Der kleine Vampir im Jammertal, 1986
Coco geht zum Geburtstag, 1986
Die Moorgeister, 1986
Möwen und Wölfe, Gedichte, 1987
Freu dich nicht zu früh, ich verlaß dich nie!, Gedichte, 1987
Der kleine Vampir liest vor, 1988
Die Unterirdischen, 1988 
Julia bei den Lebenslichtern, 1989
Florians gesammelte Gruselgeschichten, 1990
Gerneklein, 1990
Mein allerliebster Teddybär, Gedichte, 1991
Schokolowski - Der Geburtstags-Trüffelhund, 1991
Schokolowski – Lustig ist das Hundeleben, 1992
Schokolowski – Vorsicht, Hundefänger, 1992
Schokolowski – König Leckermaul, 1992
Schokolowski – Hilfe, ein Baby!, 1993
Wenn die Füchse Kaffee kochen, 1993
Benjamin Biber, 1994
Von jenseits der großen Waldes, 1994
Hanna, Gottes kleinster Engel, 1995
Das Haar der Berenice, 1998
Der kleine Vampir und die Tanzstunde, 2001
Der kleine Vampir hat Geburtstag, 2001
Kasimir von Käsebleich kommt in die Schule, 2003
Kasimir von Käsebleich und der Ranzenmann, 2003
Jeremy Golden und der Meister der Schatten, 2005
Der kleine Vampir und die Gruselnacht,2006
Der kleine Vampir und die letzte Verwandlung, 2007
Der kleine Vampir und die Frage aller Fragen, 2015

References

External links

1948 births
Living people
German children's writers
German fantasy writers
German women poets
German women novelists
German expatriates in the United States
People from Stormarn (district)
University of Hamburg alumni
German women children's writers
Women science fiction and fantasy writers
People from Silver City, New Mexico